The Government agencies in Bangladesh are state controlled organizations that act independently to carry out the policies of the Government of Bangladesh. The Government Ministries are relatively small and merely policy-making organizations, allowed to control agencies by policy decisions. Some of the work of the government is carried out through state enterprises or limited companies.

Legislative
 Jatiya Sangsad
 Office of the Speaker of the Jatiya Sangsad
 Sangsad committees
 Parliament Secretariat
 Sangsad Television
Sangsad Library

Judicial branch

Supreme Court
 Supreme Court
 Appellate Division
 High Court Division
Chief Justice
Attorney General

District Courts

Civil Courts
 District Judge Court
 Additional District Judge Court
 Joint District Judge Court
 Senior Assistant Judge Court
 Assistant Judge Court

Criminal Courts
Session Judge Court
 District Judge Court
District Session Judge Court
 Additional District Session Judge Court
 Joint District Session Judge Court
Magistrate Court
 District Magistrate Court
Chief Judicial Magistrate Court
 Additional Chief Judicial Magistrate Court
 Senior Judicial Magistrate Court
 Judicial Magistrate Court

Metropolitan Courts
Criminal Courts

 Metropolitan Judge Court
 Metropolitan Session Judge Court
 Additional Metropolitan Session Judge Court
 Joint Metropolitan Session Judge Court
 Metropolitan Magistrate Court
 Chief Metropolitan Magistrate Court
 Additional Chief Metropolitan Magistrate Court

Specialized Courts and Tribunals
 Constitutional Court
 None
Administrative Court 
 Administrative Tribunals
Finance Court
 Money Loan Courts
 Insolvency Courts
 Income Tax Appellate Tribunals
 Special Tribunal for Share Market Scam
Labour Court
 Labour Courts
Court of Justice
 International Crimes Tribunal
Social Court
 Druto Bichar Tribunal
 Bangladesh Cyber Tribunal

Executive branch

President's Office
 Bangabhaban
Public Division
Personal Division
Toshakhana

Prime Minister's Office

Cabinet Division
Armed Forces Division	
Bangladesh Navy
Bangladesh Air Force
Bangladesh Army
Offices
National Economic Council
 Bangladesh Economic Zones Authority (BEZA)
 Bangladesh Export Processing Zone Authority (BEPZA)
 Bangladesh Investment Development Authority
 Board of Investment
 Privatization Commission, Bangladesh
 Public-Private Partnership Authority (PPPA)
 Governance Innovation Unit (GIU)
 National Security Intelligence (NSI)
 National Skills Development Authority (NSDA)
NGO Affairs Bureau
Special Security Force
Sub-regional Co-operation Cell (SRCC)
Private Export Processing Zone (PEPZ)
Project
Ashrayan Project (Human Resource Development)
Access to Information (A2I) Programme (ICT Services)
 Development Assistance for Special Area (except CHT)

Ministry of Chittagong Hill Tracts Affairs
Chittagong Hill Tracts Development Board 
Refugee Rehabilitation Task Force
Khagrachhari Hill District Council
Chittagong Hill Tracts Regional Council
Bandarban Hill District Council
Rangamati Hill District Council

Ministry of Primary and Mass Education
 Bureau of Non-Formal Education
National Academy for Primary Education
 Directorate of Primary Education

Ministry of Agriculture

Agencies
Agriculture Information Service (AIS)
Department of Agricultural Marketing
Department of Agricultural Extension
National Institute of Biotechnology
Cotton Development Board
Barind Multipurpose Development Authority
Bangladesh Agricultural Research Institute
Bangladesh Agricultural Research Council
Bangladesh Sugarcane Research Institute
Bangladesh Rice Research Institute
Bangladesh Institute of Nuclear Agriculture
Bangladesh Jute Research Institute (BJRI)
Bangladesh Institute of Research and Training on Applied Nutrition
Soil Resources Development Institute
SAARC Agriculture Centre (SAC)
Seed Certification Agency
Enterprises
Bangladesh Agricultural Development Corporation

Ministry of Civil Aviation and Tourism
Bangladesh Parjatan Corporation (Tourism Corporation)
Bangladesh Tourism Board
Civil Aviation Authority, Bangladesh
Limited Company
Bangladesh Biman

Ministry of Commerce
Bangladesh Competition Commission
Office of the Registrar of Joint Stock Companies and Firms
Office of Chief Controller of Imports and Exports
The Institute of Cost and Management Accountants
The Institute of Chartered Accountants of Bangladesh
Directorate of National Consumer Rights Protection
Trading Corporation of Bangladesh (TCB)
Bangladesh Tea Board
Bangladesh Tariff Commission
Bangladesh Foreign Trade Institute
Bangladesh Export Promotion Bureau
Bangladesh Tea Research Institute

Ministry of Road Transport and Bridges
Road Transport and Highways Division
Dhaka Transport Coordination Authority
Bangladesh Road Transport Authority
Bangladesh Road Transport Corporation
Roads and Highways Department
Bridges Division
Bangladesh Bridge Authority

Ministry of Cultural Affairs
Department of Archives and Libraries
Department of Public Libraries
Nazrul Institute
Bengali Academy
Bangladesh Copyright Office
Bangladesh National Museum
Bangladesh Folk Arts and Crafts Foundation

Ministry of Defence
Controller General of Defence Finance
The National Defence College
Directorate General of Defence Purchase
Bangladesh Ordnance Factories
Bangladesh Meteorological Department
Survey of Bangladesh
Bangladesh Space Research and Remote Sensing Organization
Military Institute of Science & Technology
Defence Services Command and Staff College
Office Of The Chief Administrative Officer
Department of Military Lands and Cantonments

Ministry of Food
 Directorate General of Food

Ministry of Education

Ministry of Power, Energy and Mineral Resources

Ministry of Environment and Forest
Bangladesh Climate Change Trust
Department of Environment
Forest Department
Bangladesh National Herbarium
Bangladesh Forest Research Institute (BFRI)
Bangladesh Forest Industries Development Corporation
Forestry Development and Training Centre, Kaptai
Bangladesh Forest College

Ministry of Public Administration
Bangladesh Employees Welfare Board (BKKB)
Bangladesh Public Administration Training Centre (BPATC)
Bangladesh Public Service Commission
Bangladesh Civil Service Administration Academy
BIAM Foundation
Department of Printing and Publications
Department of Government Transport
Bangladesh Government Press
Government Printing Press
Bangladesh Forms and Publication Office
Bangladesh Stationery Office

Ministry of Fisheries and Livestock
Department of Livestock
Bangladesh Fisheries Research Institute
Department of Livestock Services
Department of Fisheries
Bangladesh Livestock Research Institute (BLRI)
Bangladesh Fisheries Development Corporation
Marine Fisheries Academy
Bangladesh Veterinary Council

Ministry of Finance

Ministry of Foreign Affairs
 American Institute of Bangladesh Studies
 Permanent Representative of Bangladesh to the United Nations
 Bangladesh Institute of International and Strategic Studies (BIISS)
 Bangladesh Institute of Law and International Affairs
Foreign Service Academy
List of diplomatic missions of Bangladesh

Ministry of Health and Family Welfare
Health Service Division
Disease International Centre for Diarrhoeal Disease Research, Bangladesh
Department of Drug Administration
Directorate General of Nursing and Midwifery
Directorate General of Health Services
Health Economics Unit
Department of Public Health Engineering
Bangladesh Nursing and Midwifery Council
Health Engineering Department
Institute of Epidemiology Disease Control And Research
Medical Education And Family Welfare Division
National Population Research and Training Center
Directorate General of Family Planning

Ministry of Home Affairs

Ministry of Housing and Public Works

Public Works Department
Department of Architecture
Housing and Building Research Institute
Directorate of Government Accommodation
National Housing Authority
Urban Development Directorate
City Development Authorities
Capital Development Authority (RAJUK)
Chittagong Development Authority (CDA)
Khulna Development Authority
Rajshahi Development Authority
Cox's Bazar Development Authority

Ministry of Industries

Ministry of Information
Press Information Department (Information)
 Press Institute of Bangladesh
 Bangladesh Sangbad Sanstha
 Bangladesh Press Council
 Department of Mass Communication (Broadcasting)
 Bangladesh Betar
 Bangladesh Television
 Sangsad TV
 Department of Films and Publications (Films)
 Bangladesh Film Development Corporation
 Bangladesh Film Censor Board
 Bangladesh Film Archive

Ministry of Textiles and Jute
Department of Jute
Bangladesh Handloom Board
Bangladesh Jute Mills Corporation
Bangladesh Textile Mills Corporation
Bangladesh Sericulture Development Board
Bangladesh Sericulture Research and Training Institute
Jute Diversification Promotion Center
Department of Textiles
Bangladesh Jute Corporation

Ministry of Labour and Employment
Department of Inspection for Factories and Establishments
Child Labour Unit
Minimum Wage Board
Department of Labour
Labour Appellate Tribunal
Central Fund
National Child Labour Welfare Council

Ministry of Law, Justice and Parliamentary Affairs
Law and Justice Division
Bangladesh Supreme Court
 Bangladesh Law Commission
 Bangladesh Judicial Service Commission
National Legal Aid Services Organization
 Directorate of Registration
Judicial Administration Training Institute
Legislative and Parliamentary Affairs Division
 Bangladesh Law Commission
 Bangladesh National Human Rights Commission
 The Attorney General's Office

Ministry of Land
Land Appeal Board
Land Record and Survey Department
Land Reform Board
Land Administration Training Centre (LATC)

Ministry of Local Government, Rural Development and Co-operatives

Ministry of Planning
1. Planning Division

 Bangladesh Institute of Development Studies
 Planning Commission
 National Academy for Planning and Development

2. Statistics and Informatics Division

 Bangladesh Bureau of Statistics

3. Implementation Monitoring and Evaluation Division

 Central Procurement Technical Unit

Ministry of Posts, Telecommunications and Information Technology

Ministry of Religious Affairs
Office of the Waqf Administrator
Christian Religious Welfare Trust
Bangladesh Hajj Office
Buddhist Religious Welfare Trust
Islamic Foundation Bangladesh
Hindu Religious Welfare Trust
Bangladesh Haj Office, Jeddah

Ministry of Shipping
Chittagong Port Authority
Bangladesh Land Port Authority
National Maritime Institute
Bangladesh Inland Water Transport Authority
Bangladesh Inland Water Transport Corporation
Bangladesh Marine Academy
Bangladesh Shipping Corporation
Mongla Port Authority
Payra Port Authority
Department of Shipping
Directorate of Seamen and Emigration Welfare

Ministry of Social Welfare
National Disabled Development Foundation
Bangladesh National Social Welfare Council
Department of Social Services
Sheikh Zayed Bin Sultan al Nahyan Trust Bangladesh
Physically Disabled Protection Trust
Neuro-Developmental Disability Protection Trust

Ministry of Women and Children Affairs
National Women's Agency
Bangladesh Shishu Academy
Department of Women Affairs
National Trauma Counselling Centre
Joyeeta Foundation

Ministry of Water Resources
Institute of Water Modeling
River Research Institute
Water Resources Planning Organisation (WARPO)
Bangladesh Water Development Board
Bangladesh Haor and Wetland Development Board
Flood Forecasting and Warning Centre
Joint River Commission, Bangladesh
Centre for Environmental and Geographic Information Services

Ministry of Youth and Sports
Directorate of Sports
National Sports Council
Bangladesh Krira Shikkha Protishtan (BKSP) (Bangladesh Sports Education)
Youth Development Department
Sheikh Hasina National Youth Center
Bangabandhu Krirashebi Kalyan Foundation
Sheikh Hasina National Institute of Youth Development

Ministry of Liberation War Affairs
 Bangladesh Freedom Fighter Welfare Trust
 National Freedom Fighter Council

Ministry of Expatriates' Welfare and Overseas Employment
Bureau of Manpower Employment and Training
Bangladesh Institute of Marine Technology
Wage Earners' Welfare Board (WEWB)
Wages Earners’ Welfare Fund
Bangladesh Overseas Employment and Services Limited (BOESL)
Probashi Kallyan Bank

Ministry of Railways
Bangladesh Railway
Department of Railway Inspection

Ministry of Science and Technology
Bangladesh Atomic Energy Commission
Bangladesh Council of Scientific and Industrial Research
National Museum of Science and Technology
National Institute of Biotechnology
Bangladesh Computer Council
Bangladesh National Scientific and Technical Documentation Centre
Bangabandhu Sheikh Mujibur Rahman Novo Theatre
National Museum of Science and Technology
Bangladesh Hi-Tech Park Authority
Bangabandhu Hi-Tech City
Bangladesh Atomic Energy Regulatory Authority
Bangladesh Oceanographic Research Institute
Nuclear Power Plant Company Bangladesh Limited
Bangabandhu Science and Technology Fellowship Trust
National Council for Science and Technology

Ministry of Disaster Management and Relief
Cyclone Preparedness Programme (CPP)
Disaster Management Directorate
Office of the Refugee Relief and Repatriation Commissioner

Other agencies
Comptroller and Auditor General of Bangladesh
Bangladesh Planning Commission
Bangladesh Election Commission
Bangladesh Public Service Commission
Anti-Corruption Commission
National Human Rights Commission of Bangladesh

Intelligence

National
Bangladeshi intelligence community
National Security Intelligence
Special Branch
Criminal Investigation Department
Counter Terrorism and Transnational Crime Unit

Military
 Directorate General of Forces Intelligence (DGFI)
 Directorate of Naval Intelligence
 Directorate of Air Intelligence
 Directorate of Military Intelligence
 Directorate of Counterintelligence 
 Counter Terrorism and Intelligence Bureau

See also
 Politics of Bangladesh
 Government of Bangladesh
 List of Government-Owned Companies of Bangladesh

References

 
Agencies
Bangladesh
Government